Neidalia villacresi is a moth of the family Erebidae first described by Paul Dognin in 1894. It is found in Ecuador.

References

 

Phaegopterina
Moths described in 1894